Wychough is a former civil parish in Cheshire West and Chester, England.  It contained two buildings that are recorded in the National Heritage List for England as designated listed buildings, both of which are listed at Grade II.   This grade is the lowest of the three gradings given to listed buildings and is applied to "buildings of national importance and special interest".  The parish is entirely rural, and the listed building are a farmhouse and a dovecote.

References

Listed buildings in Cheshire West and Chester
Lists of listed buildings in Cheshire
Listed buildings in Wychough